The Hard Game (Swedish: Den hårda leken) is a 1956 Swedish sports drama film directed by Lars-Eric Kjellgren and starring Sven-Eric Gamble, Ann-Marie Gyllenspetz and Åke Grönberg. It was shot at the Råsunda Studios in Stockholm and on location in Gothenburg. The film's sets were designed by the art director P.A. Lundgren.

Synopsis
A promising young working-class boxer Conny Persson is pushed hard by his unscrupulous manager Andy Ekström. When Conny meets and falls in love with Margit Söderberg, she tries to persuade him to quit the cynical boxing profession and concentrate on running a flower shop with her

Cast
 Sven-Eric Gamble as 	Conny Persson
 Ann-Marie Gyllenspetz as 	Margit Söderberg
 Åke Grönberg as 	Andy Ekström
 John Elfström as	William Persson
 Märta Dorff as 	Ester, Conny's mother
 Lissi Alandh as 	Sally, waitress
 Sten Gester as 	Viking Svensson
 Sissi Kaiser as 	Karin
 Arne Källerud as Pram
 Erik Strandmark as 	Wille Thoren
 Britta Brunius as 	Margit's mother
 Olav Riégo as 	Margit's father
 Henrik Schildt as 	Redman
 Stig Johanson as 	Brollan
 Erik Molin as 	Bigge Ek
 Bengt Ahlin as Boxer 
 Sten Ardenstam as 	Guest at café 
 Horace Brandt as Boxing referee 
 Jens Brandt as Boxer 
 Gösta Brodén as Photographer
 Eskil Engstrand as 	Boxer 
 Jerry Eriksson as 	Boxer 
 Elisabet Falk as 	Britta Lindström 
 Gustaf Gustafson as 	Florist 
 Jan Henrikson as 	Boxer 
 Willy Karlsson as 	Florist 
 Gunnar 'Knas' Lindkvist as 	Man at fairground 
 Charlie Löfman as 	Nisse Sandberg 
 Gösta Malmborg as 	Man with gong 
 Charles Moore as 	Black boxer 
 Gunnar Nielsen as 	Kalle Johansson 
 John Nilsson as Jonne Ring
 Nils Olsson as Boxer 
 Tord Peterson as Fimpen 
 Hanny Schedin as 	Margit's friend 
 Olle Seijbold as 	Photographer 
 Gunnar Thim as 	Sotarn 
 Ivar Wahlgren as 	Backman 
 Boris Wiklund as Boxer

References

Bibliography 
 Crosson, Seán (ed.).Sport, Film and National Culture. Routledge, 2020.
 Qvist, Per Olov & von Bagh, Peter. Guide to the Cinema of Sweden and Finland. Greenwood Publishing Group, 2000.

External links 
 

1956 films
Swedish drama films
1956 drama films
Swedish sports films
1950s sports films
1950s Swedish-language films
Films directed by Lars-Eric Kjellgren
Swedish black-and-white films
Boxing films
1950s Swedish films